Aikens v. California, 406 U.S. 813 (1972), was a decision of the United States Supreme Court where a petitioner (in the U.S. Supreme Court, the plaintiff (Aikens) is called the petitioner and the defendant (the State of California) is called the respondent) was appealing his conviction and death sentence. After oral argument had been made on the case, but before the court decided on it, the Supreme Court of California in People v. Anderson, declared the death penalty unconstitutional under the state constitution.  This made his appeal unnecessary because the decision in Anderson

The Supreme Court would decide later that year, in Furman v. Georgia, that the Death Penalty was under certain circumstances unconstitutional.  Aikens was originally one of four cases that were selected along with Furman, but when the Anderson case was decided by the California Supreme Court, Aikens became moot.

See also
 List of United States Supreme Court cases, volume 406

References

External links
 

United States Supreme Court cases
United States Supreme Court cases of the Burger Court
United States death penalty case law
Capital punishment in California
1972 in United States case law
1972 in California
Legal history of California